The Pilot Butte Inn was a hotel building in Bend, Oregon, in the United States. Designed by American architects Tourtellotte & Hummel, the inn was built in 1917 and exhibited American Craftsman style architecture.

Description and history
The Pilot Butte Inn was built in 1917 on the banks of the Deschutes River in Bend, Oregon. The hotel building, described as a "rustic sportsman’s lodge", was designed by architect John E. Tourtellotte. It exhibited American Craftsman style architecture and made use of local materials like pine and river rock. 

In 1972, the inn became the first site in Deschutes County to be listed on the National Register of Historic Places. However, the building was demolished in June 1973.

See also
 National Register of Historic Places listings in Deschutes County, Oregon

References

External links
 National Register of Historic Places Inventory: Nomination Form, UO Libraries

1917 establishments in Oregon
1973 disestablishments in Oregon
American Craftsman architecture in Oregon
Tourtellotte & Hummel buildings
Buildings and structures demolished in 1973
Demolished buildings and structures in Oregon
Demolished hotels in the United States
Former National Register of Historic Places in Oregon
Hotel buildings completed in 1917
Hotels in Bend, Oregon
National Register of Historic Places in Bend, Oregon